This is a list of women writers who were born in Argentina or whose writings are closely associated with this country.

A
Florencia Abbate (born 1976), novelist, poet, essayist, short story writer, journalist
Margarita Abella Caprile (1901–1960), poet, novelist, short story writer, travel writer, journalist
Marcelina Almeida (ca. 1830–1880), writer
Agustina Andrade (1858–1891), poet
Judith Astelarra (born 1943), sociologist specializing in gender studies
Elizabeth Azcona Cranwell (1933–2004), surrealist poet, short story writer, critic, translator

B
Ana Baron (1950–2015), writer, journalist
Odile Baron Supervielle (1915–2016), writer, journalist
Emma de la Barra (1861–1947), best selling novelist
Emma Barrandeguy (1914–2006), poet, novelist, journalist, translator
Diana Bellessi (born 1946), poet, essayist
Juana Bignozzi (1937–2015), translator, journalist, poet
Poldy Bird (1941–2018), poet, essayist, columnist
Liliana Bodoc (1958–2018), novelist
Ivonne Bordelois (born 1934), poet, essayist, linguist
Alicia Borinsky, (fl. since 1975), novelist, poet, critic
Norah Borges (1901–1998), artist, illustrator, poet, journalist
Elsa Bornemann (1952–2013), children's writer
Herminia Brumana (1897–1954), novelist, playwright, journalist
Silvina Bullrich (1915–1990), best selling novelist, translator, screenwriter, critic
Delfina Bunge (1881–1952), poet, short story writer, essayist

C
Susana Calandrelli (1901–1978), poet, novelist, short story writer, essayist, textbook writer
Estela Canto (1919–1994), novelist, biographer, journalist, translator
María Luisa Carnelli (1898–1987), poet, journalist
Albertina Carri (born 1973), actress, screenwriter, film director
Nené Cascallar (1914–1982), playwright for radio and television, screenwriter
Flavia Company (born 1963), novelist, poet
Celia Correas de Zapata (1933–2022), poet, non-fiction writer, historian, educator
Maria Sonia Cristoff (born 1965), novelist, short story writer, non-fiction writer
Emilce Cuda (born 1965), Catholic theologian, professor and writer
María Guadalupe Cuenca (1790–1854), letter writer
Maria Renee Cura (died 2007), indologist, non-fiction writer

D
Emma de Cartosio (1928–2013), writer, poet, storyteller, essayist
Adelia Di Carlo (1883–1965) writer, chronicler, founder
Alicia Dujovne Ortiz (born 1940), poet, columnist, short story writer, biographer

E
Ada María Elflein (1880–1919), poet, columnist, translator, teacher
Mariana Enríquez (born 1973), journalist, novelist, short story writer

F
Paloma Fabrykant (born 1981), artist, journalist, non-fiction writer, mixed martial arts expert
Manuela Fingueret (1945–2013), poet, novelist, journalist, essayist
Luisa Futoransky (born 1939), poet, novelist, journalist, scholar

G
Sara Gallardo (1931–1988), novelist, short story writer
Griselda Gambaro (born 1928), novelist, playwright, short story writer, essayist, young adult writer
Carlota Garrido de la Peña (1870–1958), journalist, writer, teacher
Alicia Ghiragossian (1936–2014), poet
Betina Gonzalez (born 1972), novelist, short story writer
Clotilde González de Fernández (1880–1935), non-fiction writer, educator
Viviana Gorbato (1950–2005), journalist, writer, professor
Angélica Gorodischer (1928–2022), short story writer, novelist
Juana Manuela Gorriti (1818–1892), novelist, short story writer, politician
Rosa Guerra (1834–1864), educator, journalist, writer
Beatriz Guido (1924–1988), novelist, screenwriter

H
Liliana Heker (born 1943), short story writer, novelist, essayist

I
Marcela Iacub (born 1964), French-language novelist, essayist 
Sylvia Iparraguirre (born 1947), novelist, human rights activist

K
Nelly Kaplan (1931–2020), French-language novelist, essayist, script writer
Bertha Koessler-Ilg (1881–1965), German-born Argentine folklorist
Alicia Kozameh (born 1953), novelist, short story writer, poet

L
María Hortensia Lacau (1910–2006), pedagogue, writer, essayist, poet, educator
Ana Emilia Lahitte (1921–2013), poet, playwright, essayist, journalist
Norah Lange (1905–1972), poet, novelist, autobiographer
Belén López Peiró (born 1992), writer and columnist
Marta Lynch (1925–1985), novelist, short story writer
Pilar de Lusarreta (1914–1967), journalist, short story writer, essayist, critic

M
Eduarda Mansilla (1834–1892), novelist, playwright, essayist, music critic, composer
Daisy May Queen (born 1965), radio and television presenter, writer
Rosita Melo (1897–1981), pianist, composer, songwriter, poet
Martha Mercader (1926–2010), politician, novelist, short story writer, essayist, children's writer
Tununa Mercado (born 1939), novelist, short story writer, essayist
Liliana Díaz Mindurry (born 1953), poet, novelist, short story writer 
Susana Molinari Leguizamón, from 1939, poet
Graciela Montes (born 1947), children's writer, translator
Ana Gloria Moya (1954–2013), novelist
Cristina Mucci (born 1949), writer, journalist

N
María Negroni (born 1951), poet, essayist, novelist, translator

O
Clara Obligado (born 1950), novelist, short story writer
Silvina Ocampo (1903–1993), poet, short story writer, playwright
Victoria Ocampo (1890–1979), magazine publisher, critic, journalist, essayist, autobiographer, translator
María Rosa Oliver (1898–1977), short story writer, essayist, critic, translator
Olga Orozco (1920–1999), poet, journalist
Elvira Orphée (1922–2018), novelist, short story writer

P
Agustina Palacio de Libarona (1825–1880), non-fiction writer, storyteller, heroine
Alicia Partnoy (born 1955), poet, translator, human rights activist
Josefina Passadori (1900–1987), writer, educator
Clara Passafari (1930–1994), anthropologist, non-fiction writer, poet
Luisa Peluffo (born 1941), journalist, poet, novelist
Alejandra Pizarnik (1936–1972), poet, journalist
Lucía Puenzo (born 1976), novelist, film director
Adriana Puiggrós (born 1941), non-fiction writer, politician, educator

R
Patricia Ratto (born 1962), writer, teacher
Viviana Rivero (born 1966), writer
Petrona Rosende (1797–1893), poet, journalist

S
María Sáez de Vernet (1800–1858), chronicler of Argentine settlement of the Falkland Islands
Matilde Sánchez (born 1958), journalist, writer, and translator
Beatriz Sarlo (born 1942), critic, journal editor, non-fiction writer
Samanta Schweblin (born 1978), novelist, short story writer
Susy Shock (born 1968), actress, writer, singer
Ana María Shua (born 1951), novelist, short story writer, poet, essayist, playwright, children's writer
Sara Solá de Castellanos (1890–?), poet, novelist, playwright, lyricist
Alicia Steimberg (1933–2012), novelist, short story writer, translator
Alfonsina Storni (1892–1938), poet, playwright
Matilde Alba Swann (1912–2000), poet, journalist, lawyer

T
María Dhialma Tiberti (1928–1987), novelist, poet
Marta Traba (1923–1983), art critic, novelist
Raymunda Torres y Quiroga (?-?), 19th-century writer and women's rights activist

U
Hebe Uhart (1936–2018), novelist, short story writer

V
Luisa Valenzuela (born 1938), novelist, short story writer, essayist 
Aurora Venturini (1922–2015), novelist, short story writer, poet, essayist, translator
Esther Vilar (born 1935), German-language non-fiction writer, playwright
Paulina Vinderman (born 1944), poet, translator

W
Paula Wajsman (1939–1995), psychologist, poet, translator, researcher
María Elena Walsh (1930–2011), children's writer, poet, novelist, playwright, musician
Susana, Lady Walton (1926–1983), non-fiction writer in English
Ema Wolf (born 1948), writer, journalist

Y
 Laura Yasán (1960–2021), poet

See also
List of Argentine writers
List of women writers
List of Spanish-language authors

-
Argentine women writers, List of
Writers
Writers